Los Cuatro Diablos Airport,  is an airport  east of Melipilla, a city in the Santiago Metropolitan Region of Chile.

The airport is in the Maipo River valley, and there is rising terrain in all quadrants.

See also

Transport in Chile
List of airports in Chile

References

External links
OpenStreetMap - Los Cuatro Diablos
OurAirports - Los Cuatro Diablos
SkyVector - Los Cuatro Diablos
FallingRain - Los Cuatro Diablos Airport

Airports in Santiago Metropolitan Region